William James Glazier (born 2 August 1943) is an English retired professional footballer who played as a goalkeeper. He is best remembered for his time in the Football League with Coventry City, for whom he made over 390 appearances and is a member of the club's Hall of Fame. He was capped by England at U23 level and represented the Football League XI.

Club career

Early years 
Glazier's involvement in football began with a spell as a member of the ground staff at Third Division club Torquay United, before he was released due to lack of funds.

Crystal Palace 
In October 1961, Glazier joined Third Division club Crystal Palace on trial, which was arranged by virtue of his family's bread delivery man being a personal friend of Palace captain Johnny McNichol. Glazier was signed on the strength of his performance for the Palace 'A' team in a match versus Dover. He quickly displaced Vic Rouse as first-choice goalkeeper and was an ever-present during the 1963–64 season, in which the club secured promotion to the Second Division with a runners-up finish. Glazier departed Selhurst Park in October 1964, after making 113 appearances for Palace.

Coventry City 
In October 1964, the manager of Second Division club Coventry City, Jimmy Hill, signed Glazier for a then world-record fee for a goalkeeper of £35,000. Glazier suffered a broken leg in a match versus Manchester City in April 1965, which kept him out of the game for a year. He returned to play in the Coventry team which won the Second Division title in the 1966–67 season. Now playing in the First Division, Glazier continued as the club's first-choice goalkeeper until August 1975. He was awarded a testimonial in November 1974 versus an England 1966 World Cup XI, with Glazier scoring twice in a 6–6 draw. Glazier made 392 appearances in 11 years at Highfield Road. He twice won the Coventry City Player of the Year award (1968–69 and 1973–74) and was inducted into the club's Hall of Fame.

Brentford 
Glazier dropped down to the Fourth Division to sign for Brentford for a £12,500 fee in August 1975. The move was helped along by Jimmy Hill (by now working as a broadcaster), who put Glazier in touch with Brentford manager John Docherty, who had been looking for a goalkeeper after loanee Steve Sherwood returned to Chelsea. Business interests and problems commuting from his Brighton home meant that Glazier couldn't give his full commitment to the Bees and he left the club after making just 12 appearances.

St. Louis Stars 
Glazier ended his career with a spell at North American Soccer League club St. Louis Stars in 1977.

International and representative career 
Glazier won three caps for the England U23 team and kept a clean sheet in each match. One of Glazier's caps came against Romania at Highfield Road (home of his then-club side Coventry City) drew a crowd of 27,476, one of the highest attendances for an U23 match in England. A broken leg suffered with Coventry City in 1965 cut short Glazier's international career, as he was over the age-limit after returning to fitness. In March 1970, Glazer played for the Football League in a 3–2 win over its Scottish counterparts.

Personal life 
Early in his career, Glazier lived in Brighton, where his parents ran a guesthouse. After retiring from football, Glazier ran a hotel in Brighton before moving to Spain for 12 years, where he worked in swimming pool maintenance. He returned to the UK in 1998 and settled in Lincolnshire, where he began a catering business with his wife.

Honours 
Crystal Palace

 Football League Third Division second-place promotion (1): 1963–64

Coventry City
Football League Second Division (1): 1966–67

Individual

 Coventry City Player of the Year (2): 1968–69, 1973–74
 Coventry City Hall of Fame

Career statistics

References

External links
 

1943 births
Living people
English footballers
English Football League players
Crystal Palace F.C. players
Coventry City F.C. players
Brentford F.C. players
North American Soccer League (1968–1984) players
St. Louis Stars (soccer) players
England under-23 international footballers
English Football League representative players
Association football goalkeepers
Footballers from Nottingham
English expatriate footballers
Expatriate soccer players in the United States
Torquay United F.C. non-playing staff
English expatriate sportspeople in Spain
English expatriate sportspeople in the United States